Cracow is a rural town and locality in the Shire of Banana, Queensland, Australia.

Historically, Cracow is a gold mining town, with some recent mines opening.

Geography
The town is located on the Eidsvold–Theodore Road,  by road north-west of the state capital, Brisbane.

Cracow has the following mountains:
  Mount Edwards (Mount Bannister) 
  Mount Elvinia 
  Mount Irving 
  Mount Steel

History

The town was named after a pastoral run, which was in turn named by pastoralist John Ross, in 1851, for the Polish city of Kraków, which had recently been the centre for a fight for Polish national independence. However, some believe it to have gotten the name sound of cracking stock whips echoing throughout the ranges.

Gold was first discovered in Cracow in 1875 by itinerant fossickers and a further discovery of a nugget was made by an Aboriginal stockman, Johnny Nipps in 1916. In 1931, the Golden Plateau mine was established and it operated continuously until 1976. A total of  592,578 ounces of ore was mined from the Golden Plateau, which at the time of its closure was an equivalent of $60mil.

Cracow Post Office opened on 1 October 1932 and was destroyed in a fire in 2006.

Cracow State School opened on 12 June 1933. It was moved in 1935 after a young boy drowned in a nearby creek. The school remained there until its closure on 12 December 1997. It was at 11-17 Third Avenue. The school building was moved to a nearby cattle station.

At its gold mining peak, the town included five cafes, barber shop, billiard saloon, two butchers, a picture theatre and a soft drink factory. The closure of the mine led to Cracow becoming a ghost town with many deserted houses and shops.

Circa 2000, Fred Brophy and wife Sandi purchased the Cracow Hotel. He operated his famous boxing tent as an annual event in Cracow.

In 2004, Newcrest Mining reestablished gold mining in the town, leading to hopes the town may recover. This mine is now operated by Aeris Resources. The shops are vacant although the hotel remains open.

The 2019 horror-comedy film Two Heads Creek was filmed on location in Cracow.

Facilities

The Cracow Hotel at 30 Third Avenue (corner Tenth Avenue) is the only remaining business in the township, as it attracts a lot of tourists due to its array of antique and unusual artifacts adorning the ceilings and walls. The hotel has been under new ownership as of March 2021. The Cracow hotel is now owned by Nikki Burke and family.

The Cracow community centre is at 57-63 Tenth Avenue and is operated by the Banana Shire Council.

There is also a caravan park located at 11 Third Avenue, next to the old court house which has been turned into a museum.

Education 
There are no schools in Cracow. The nearest government school is Theodore State School in Theodore to the north-west; it provides primary education and secondary education to Year 10. There is no nearby school providing secondary education to Year 12; options are distance education and boarding school.

References

External links

 
 

Towns in Queensland
Mining towns in Queensland
Populated places established in 1931
1931 establishments in Australia
Shire of Banana
Localities in Queensland